Finds from Vimose, on the island of Funen, Denmark, include some of the oldest datable Elder Futhark runic inscriptions in early Proto-Norse or late Proto-Germanic from the 2nd to 3rd century in the Scandinavian Iron Age and were written in the time of the Roman Empire.

Vimose Comb (c. 160, considered the oldest known datable runic inscription altogether):  harja (ᚺᚨᚱᛃᚨ)
Vimose Buckle (c. 200) aadagasu =? ansuz-a(n)dag-a(n)su / laasauwija =? la-a[n]sau-wija;
Vimose Chape (c. 250): mariha || [.]ala /  makija; possibly "Mari (the famous one) is the sword of Alla"
Vimose Woodplane (c. 300) talijo gisai oj: wiliz [..]la o[...] / tkbis: hleuno: an[.]: regu
 Vimose Sheathplate (c. 300):  ; possibly "son/descendant of Awa"
Vimose Spearhead: [w]agni[ŋ]o

See also
Illerup
Meldorf fibula
Thorsberg moor

References

External links
Runic inscriptions from the first period

Elder Futhark inscriptions
Proto-Norse language